Jessica O'Toole and Amy Rardin are an American screenwriting duo.
The pair have written scripts for the American Girl series, the Disney Channel Original Movie Invisible Sister, as well as television series Selfie, Greek, The Carrie Diaries, Jane the Virgin and الآنسة فرح. The two are currently executive producers The CW's reboot of Charmed.

References

External links 
 
 

Living people
Place of birth missing (living people)
Year of birth missing (living people)
Screenwriting duos
American television writers
21st-century American screenwriters
American women television writers
21st-century American women writers